Asura strigibasis is a moth of the family Erebidae. It is found in Vietnam.

References

Moths described in 1930
strigibasis
Moths of Asia